Maslog, officially the Municipality of Maslog, is a 5th class municipality in the province of Eastern Samar, Philippines. According to the 2020 census, it has a population of 5,463 people.

Geography

Barangays
Maslog is politically subdivided into 12 barangays.
 Bulawan
 Carayacay
 Libertad
 Malobago
 Maputi
 Barangay 1 (Poblacion)
 Barangay 2 (Poblacion)
 San Miguel
 San Roque
 Tangbo
 Taytay
 Tugas

Climate

Demographics

Economy

References

External links
 [ Philippine Standard Geographic Code]
 Philippine Census Information
 Local Governance Performance Management System

Municipalities of Eastern Samar